The Department of Antiquities is a government department in the Hashemite Kingdom of Jordan with responsibility for archaeological research and cultural heritage management. It is part of the Ministry of Tourism and Antiquities.

The department was established in 1923 in what was then the Emirate of Transjordan, a protectorate of the British Empire. Its responsibilities are legislated for in laws no. 24 of 1934, no. 21 of 1988 and no. 22 of 2004.

The department has published an academic journal, the Annual of the Department of Antiquities of Jordan, since 1951, and has organised an international conference on the history and archaeology of Jordan every three years since 1980. It also maintains a comprehensive public geographic information system and database of archaeological sites in the country, developed in cooperation with the Getty Conservation Institute, the Middle Eastern Geodatabase for Antiquities – Jordan (MEGA-J).

Publications
Annual of the Department of Antiquities of Jordan (ADAJ)

Directors general
The department is headed by a director general.
 Ridha Tawfiq, 1923–1928
 Tawfiq Abu al-Huda, 1929
 Ala Edein Toqan, 1931
 Adeeb al-Kayed, 1933
 Hisham Kair, 1933–1939
 Gerald Lankester Harding, 1939–1956. Harding's book "The Antiquities of Jordan" is still considered a reference to this day.
 Abd el–Kareem Gharaybeh, 1956
 Saeed al-Durrah, 1956–1959
 Awni al-Dajani, 1959–1968. Al-Dajani is the first Jordanian holder of a Ph.D. in Archaeology.
 Michael Jmaiaan, 1968
 Yaacoub Ouais, 1968–1971 and 1972–1977
 Mansour al-Bataineh, 1971–1972
 Adnan al-Hadidi 1977–1989
 Ghazi Bishah, 1989–1991 and 1994–1999
 Safwan al-Tall, 1991–1994
 Fawwaz al-Khraysheh, 1999–2010
 Ziad al-Saad, 2010–2011
 Faris al-Hmoud, 2011–2013
 Monther Jamhawi, 2013–2018
 Yazeed Alian, 2018-2021
 Ahmed Shami, (acting) Feb 2021-July 2021
 Hisham al-Abadi, since July 2021

See also 
 Department of Antiquities

References

External links 
 Official website (English)
 Official website (Arabic)
 MEGA-J

Ministry of Tourism and Antiquities (Jordan)
Jordan, Antiquities, Department of
Archaeology of Jordan
Government agencies established in 1923